Onalea Gilbertson is a Canadian voice actress and musician from Calgary, Alberta. Gilbertson is most known for her own creations; Blanche: The Bittersweet Life of a Wild Prairie Dame and Requiem for a Lost Girl. 

Aside from her work in theatre, Gilbertson has worked with Blue Water Studios, doing voice-over work on the English dubs of anime. Among her credits are Chandi and Hinoki Sai in Betterman, Ceres in Ceres, Celestial Legend, Nastasha in Mobile Fighter G Gundam, Nina Wang in My-Otome, and Moonbay in Zoids: Chaotic Century.

She is often credited as Kris Rundle or Kris Hamil.

After a five years working in New York City, Onalea returned to Canada, making art music with actor, playwright and painter, Bruce Horak. Together, the pair make up the musical duo "The Railbirds".

She was a cast member of Sleep No More in New York.

Filmography

Anime
Banner of the Stars - Hecto-Cmdr, Atosuryua
Betterman - Chandy, Hinoki Sai
Beyblade: Metal Masters - Sophie
Ceres, Celestial Legend - Ceres
D.I.C.E. - Jane Thomson
Deltora Quest - Anna
Di Gi Charat Nyo! - Francoise Usada
Doki Doki School Hours - Hatoko Hori (Hori-sensei)
Dragon Ball - Launch (Blue Water Dub)
Fancy Lala - Yumi Haneishi
Flame of Recca - Fuko Kirisawa, Koran's Aide
Full Moon O Sagashite - Ms. Oshige
Gregory Horror Show - Neko-Zombie
Mobile Fighter G Gundam - Nastasha Zabigov
My-Otome - Nina Wáng
Pretty Cure - Pandora, Porun, Glenda Blackstone, Aiden, Ow Wee
Viper's Creed - Thelesia
Zeta Gundam - Beltorchika Irma
Zoids: Chaotic Century - Moonbay

Non-anime Voice Work
 Jungo -Tooey
 Weebles - Additional Voices
 Trolls: The Beat Goes On! - Lily

Video games
Battle Assault 3 featuring Gundam Seed - Murrue Ramius
Crimson Tears - Amber
Gregory Horror Show - Neko-Zombie
Mega Man X: Command Mission - Ferham

References

External links
Official Website
Onalea Gilbertson at the CrystalAcids Anime Voice Actor Database

 

Living people
Canadian video game actresses
Canadian voice actresses
Year of birth missing (living people)